Tom of Finland is a 2017 biographical drama film directed by Dome Karukoski and written by Aleksi Bardy. It stars Pekka Strang as Touko Laaksonen, better known as Tom of Finland, a Finnish homoerotic artist.

Tom of Finland premiered on 27 January 2017 at Gothenburg Film Festival and was released theatrically in Finland on 24 February 2017. It was selected as the Finnish entry for the Best Foreign Language Film at the 90th Academy Awards, but it was not nominated.

Premise
Touko Laaksonen returns home after serving in World War II. In post-war Helsinki, he makes a name for himself with his homoerotic drawings of muscular men. Before finding fame, he finds challenges from his sister and Finnish society due to his art.

Cast
 Pekka Strang as Touko Laaksonen  Tom of Finland
 Lauri Tilkanen as Veli (Nipa)
 Jessica Grabowsky as Kaija Laaksonen
  as Alijoki
 Seumas Sargent as Doug
 Jakob Oftebro as Jack
 Troy T. Scott as Tom's man
 Werner Daehn as Müller
 Þorsteinn Bachmann as editor of the Physique Pictorial Office

Reception

Awards
At the 2016 Finnish Film Affair (a "work-in-progress forum" running alongside the Helsinki International Film Festival), Tom of Finland shared the Best Pitch prize, splitting the award money with Post Punk Disorder.

At the 2017 Göteborg Film Festival, the film won the Fipresci Award.

Critical reception
On review aggregator website Rotten Tomatoes, the film has an approval rating of 83% based on 70 reviews, with an average rating of 6.9/10. The website's critics consensus reads, "Tom of Finland honors its subject with an empathetic, even-handed, and above all entertaining look at the pioneering art he produced from private turmoil." On Metacritic, the film has a weighted average score of 56 out of 100 based on 13 critics, indicating "mixed or average reviews".

See also

 List of submissions to the 90th Academy Awards for Best Foreign Language Film
 List of Finnish submissions for the Academy Award for Best Foreign Language Film

References

External links
  
 
 
 

2017 films
2017 biographical drama films
2017 LGBT-related films
2010s English-language films
2010s Finnish-language films
American biographical drama films
American LGBT-related films
Biographical films about artists
Biographical films about LGBT people
Cultural depictions of cartoonists
Danish biographical drama films
Danish LGBT-related films
English-language Finnish films
Films about comics
Films directed by Dome Karukoski
Films scored by Hildur Guðnadóttir
Films set in the 1940s
Films set in the 1950s
Films set in Helsinki
Films shot in Finland
Finnish biographical drama films
Finnish LGBT-related films
Gay-related films
German biographical drama films
German LGBT-related films
LGBT-related drama films
Swedish biographical drama films
Swedish LGBT-related films
2010s American films
2010s German films
2010s Swedish films